Raimonds Rubiks  (born 9 June 1963) is a Latvian politician, the son of Alfrēds Rubiks and the brother of Artūrs Rubiks. He is a member of Harmony and is also affiliated with the Socialist Party of Latvia.

References

External links
Saeima website

1963 births
Living people
Politicians from Riga
Socialist Party of Latvia politicians
Deputies of the 10th Saeima
Deputies of the 11th Saeima
Deputies of the 12th Saeima